The Archambault House is a historic house located at 603 Rue St. Denis in Florissant, Missouri.

Description and history 
The two-story Federal style house was built circa 1850 as a residence for Auguste Archambault, a French-Canadian mountain guide to Kit Carson, Jim Bridger and John C. Frémont. It has been listed on the National Register of Historic Places since May 13, 1976.

References

,

Houses on the National Register of Historic Places in Missouri
Federal architecture in Missouri
Houses completed in 1850
Houses in St. Louis County, Missouri
National Register of Historic Places in St. Louis County, Missouri